Hirschsprung's disease-type D brachydactyly syndrome is a very rare genetic disorder which is characterized by the partial absence of nerves in the intestines (Hirschsprung's disease) and hypoplasia (or total aplasia) of the thumb's distal phalange (brachydactyly type D). It has been described in 4 males from a 2-generation American family. The inheritance pattern was hypothesized to be either X-linked recessive or autosomal dominant with reduced penetrance.

References 

Genetic diseases and disorders